Halliwell Park is a stadium in Pocatello, Idaho. The stadium is located at 1100 W. Alameda. It is primarily used for baseball and was the home of Pocatello Giants.  The ballpark has a capacity of 2,580 people.

Current users 
The park serves as a home for the Gate City Grays of the Northern Utah League, as well as the three local high school boys baseball programs of Pocatello, Highland, and Century High schools. The field also hosts American Legion baseball in the summer.

References 

Baseball venues in Idaho
Defunct minor league baseball venues
Buildings and structures in Pocatello, Idaho
Tourist attractions in Bannock County, Idaho
High school baseball venues in the United States
Sports in Pocatello, Idaho